The Durham Miners' Gala is a large annual gathering and labour festival held on the second Saturday in July in the city of Durham, England. It is associated with the coal mining heritage (and particularly that of miners' trade unionism) of the Durham Coalfield, which stretched throughout the traditional County of Durham. It is also locally called "The Big Meeting" or "Durham Big Meeting". In the context of the Durham Miners' Gala, "gala" is usually pronounced  rather than the more common pronunciation .

Its highlight consists of a parade of banners, each typically accompanied by a brass band, which are marched to the old Racecourse, where political speeches are delivered. In the afternoon a miners' service is held in Durham Cathedral, which may include the blessing of any new banners.

The 2020 and the 2021 Galas were cancelled due to the coronavirus pandemic.

History 
The gala developed out of the miners' trade unionism, the first union being established in 1869. The Durham Miners' Association organised the first gala, which was held in 1871 in Wharton Park, Durham.

It developed into the largest unofficial miners and trade-union gathering in the United Kingdom. At its peak the gala attracted more than 300,000 people – more than seven times the population of Durham itself.

Banners would traditionally be taken on foot from its particular colliery into Durham and the event was marked by large unions of men marching on the roads leading into the city.

The gala was cancelled from 1915 to 1918 (because of the First World War), 1921, 1922 and 1926 (all because of strikes) and again from 1940 to 1945 because of the Second World War. In 1926 however the gala was held outside of Durham city, organised by miners in the village of Burnhope some 7 miles to the north of Durham itself, this marks the first and only time the gala has been held in some place other than the city. 40,000 miners from across the county marched up the hill to the village to be addressed by General Secretary of the Miners' Federation of Great Britain A. J. Cook. The effect of the 1984–85 miners' strike, which saw miners across the Durham Coalfield strike, also led to the gala being called off in 1984.
The closure of collieries in County Durham, particularly after the Second World War, reduced the numbers attending the gala. Nonetheless, even if a colliery was closed the banner was often still marched. In 2020, the Durham Miners Association cancelled the event due to the COVID-19 pandemic.

The centenary gala was held in 1983.

Present day
No deep mines remain in the Durham Coalfield, compared to over a hundred at the coalfield's peak. Despite this, the gala continues to be organised.

The 122nd gala, held in 2006, attracted over 50,000 people, and approximately 100,000 attended in 2009, making it one of the biggest political gatherings in Europe. During the morning banners are still marched to the racecourse with its tradition of speeches (recent notable speakers have included Tony Benn, Billy Bragg and Ken Livingstone) then in the afternoon to the cathedral.

In 2012 Labour Party leader Ed Miliband addressed the 128th gala; he was the first Labour Party leader to speak at the gala for 23 years, the last one being Neil Kinnock in 1989. He praised the event as "a great North East tradition" and attacked the Conservative-Liberal Democrat coalition government, saying it had "lost a generation of young people".  In 2015, all four candidates in the Labour leadership election appeared at the gala, but only Jeremy Corbyn, who had already secured the endorsement of the Durham Miners' Association, was asked to give a speech to the gala.  After winning the leadership contest, Corbyn addressed the event as Labour leader every year from 2016 to 2019.

In September 2019, a feature-length documentary about the gala was released. The Big Meeting screened across the UK and received a host of positive national reviews, including a four-star review from Peter Bradshaw of The Guardian, in which he described the film as a "rich, heartfelt and intimate tribute to the Durham Miners’ Gala."

After being cancelled due to the COVID-19 pandemic the gala returned in 2022. The attendance was 200,000, the largest gala since before the miners strike. One of the keynote speakers was Mick Lynch, general secretary of the RMT union.

Banners 

Most banners in the gala represent lodges of the National Union of Mineworkers in the Durham Area. However other unions have also been represented, particularly in recent years, as well as union banners from other parts of the UK, including NUM lodges of the Yorkshire branch and South Wales.

They are made of silk, are rectangular and hang from a cross member, from which guide ropes are held by those carrying it. Traditionally banners were draped in black cloth when there had been a death in the pit during the previous year. More recently following the closure of pits across the county they are draped with black cloth on significant anniversaries of disasters at the colliery they represent.

Many banners contain explicit socialist or communist references, having renderings of Marx, Lenin, and other prominent figures such as miners' leaders, or politicians. Chopwell, often referred to as "Little Moscow", has the only banner (the 1955 version) that contains images of both Marx and Lenin (as well as the hammer and sickle). The 1935 Chopwell banner toured the Soviet Union and is thought to reside somewhere in Moscow today. Socialist expressions also take the form of captions—for example, "Socialism through evolution" and "Need before greed" (on Blackhall Lodge's banner).

Christian themes having a socialist resonance also figure on some banners. Three successive banners of Lumley Lodge (1929, 1960, 2005) have depicted the "Lion and Lamb" and "Turning Swords into Ploughshares" images from the book of Isaiah on either side, uniquely the only all biblical banners in the Durham coalfield.

More recently, residents in former pit villages have taken it upon themselves to restore, or even create, banners. This has involved the reintegration of collieries that had left the gala. Some banners, such as Spennymoor's, represent a group of former local collieries rather than individual ones. These have received funding from the Heritage Lottery Fund.

References

Further reading

External links 

 Friends of the Durham Miners' Gala
 Durham Mining Museum
 Photographs of 1970s, (and now 2012, 2013 & 2014), Durham Miners' Banners by Peter Loud

Videos 
Spennymoor banner in 2006
Bowburn banner in 2007
 A slideshow tribute to the collieries of County Durham, including Dawdon, Murton, Seaham and Sunderland pits: 
Durham Miners' Gala 2009
NASUWT banner in 2010
Durham Miners' Gala July 2011
Murton Band in 2004

British trade unions history
Miners' labor movement
Mining in County Durham
National Union of Mineworkers (Great Britain)
Labour festivals
Durham, England
1871 establishments in England
Recurring events established in 1871
Political events in the United Kingdom
Festivals established in 1871
Socialism in England